This is a list of newspapers in the Isle of Man.

Isle of Man Courier
Isle of Man Examiner
Manx Independent
MAF Youth 

Mann
Newspapers published in the Isle of Man
Newspapers
Lists of organisations based in the Isle of Man